Alexander V. Rybakov (Russian: Александр Рыбаков, born August 11, 1985) is a Russian professional ice hockey forward who is currently an unrestricted free agent. He most recently played for HC Sochi of the Kontinental Hockey League (KHL). He has previously played with HC Spartak Moscow in the KHL.

References

External links

1985 births
Living people
Ak Bars Kazan players
Atlant Moscow Oblast players
Avtomobilist Yekaterinburg players
HC Dynamo Moscow players
HC Neftekhimik Nizhnekamsk players
Russian ice hockey forwards
Severstal Cherepovets players
HC Sochi players
HC Spartak Moscow players
Traktor Chelyabinsk players
HC Yugra players
HC Vityaz players